Denis Andreyevich Adamov (born 20 February 1998) is a Russian football goalkeeper. He plays for PFC Sochi.

Club career
He made his debut in the Russian Professional Football League for FC Krasnodar-2 on 17 May 2016 in a game against FC MITOS Novocherkassk.

He made his debut for the main squad of FC Krasnodar on 20 September 2017 in a Russian Cup game against FC Tom Tomsk.

He made his Russian Football National League debut for Krasnodar-2 on 8 September 2018 in a game against FC Avangard Kursk.

On 4 October 2019, in a PFL game of FC Krasnodar-3 against FC Inter Cherkessk he scored a winning goal with a header after a corner kick, deep into added time to establish the final score of 3–2.

He made his Russian Premier League debut for FC Krasnodar on 19 July 2020 in a game against FC Dynamo Moscow, as a substitute in the 20th minute after Matvei Safonov was sent off.

On 25 January 2021, he signed with PFC Sochi.

International
He was on the roster for the Russia national under-17 football team at the 2015 UEFA European Under-17 Championship and the 2015 FIFA U-17 World Cup, but did not play in any games at either tournament behind the first-choice goalkeeper Aleksandr Maksimenko.

Career statistics

Notes

References

External links
 
 
 

1998 births
Sportspeople from Ulyanovsk
Living people
Russian footballers
Russia youth international footballers
Association football goalkeepers
FC Krasnodar players
FC Krasnodar-2 players
PFC Sochi players
Russian Premier League players
Russian First League players
Russian Second League players